Events from the year 1873 in Sweden

Incumbents
 Monarch – Oscar II

Events

 - Foundation of the first women's rights organisation in Sweden, the Married Woman's Property Rights Association.
 5 May - The Scandinavian Monetary Union is founded.
 - Swedish krona becomes the currency.

Births
 10 April – Ingeborg Rönnblad, actress (died 1915)
 3 June – Anna Lisa Andersson, reporter (died 1958)
 13 June – Karin Swanström, actress, producer and director  (died 1942) 
 15 September – Ellen Hagen, suffragette, women's rights activist and politician (died 1967)

Deaths

 4 March - Prince August, Duke of Dalarna, royalty (born 1831) 
 27 March – Fanny Westerdahl, stage actress (died 1873) 
 31 March  - Maria Magdalena Mathsdotter, Sami  (died 1835) 
 20 May – Fredrica Ehrenborg, writer (born 1794) 
 – Ulrika von Strussenfelt, writer (born 1801)

References

 
Years of the 19th century in Sweden
Sweden